The 1947 Belgian Grand Prix was a Grand Prix motor race held at Spa-Francorchamps on 29 June 1947. The race was also known as the European Grand Prix.

Classification

Belgian Grand Prix
Belgian Grand Prix
Grand Prix
European Grand Prix